Swimming Australia is the peak governing body for competitive swimming in Australia. The body has approximately 100,000 registered members nationally in 1100 clubs across the country, which includes swimmers, coaches, officials, administrators and volunteers. The body oversees the management and development of the sport from the national team at the elite level, the conduct of national and international events, through to grass roots participation. The organisation's vision is to become Australia's leading sport through increased participation, continual outstanding performance and commercial excellence.

In 1985, the organisation had approximately 90,000 registered members.

History 
Competitive national swimming championships were first held in 1894. Australia had swimmers at most major international swimming events since the 1896 Summer Olympics.

This interest led to the creation of the Amateur Swimming Union of Australia, the precursor to Swimming Australia, which was founded in 1909 at a meeting of state swimming representatives at the Sports Club on Hunter Street in Sydney's CBD. There they established a charter which included the key features of the promotion of uniformity of rules and regulations across Australia; the adjudication all matters of disputes between affiliated associations; the control and management of swimmers visiting Australia; the control and management of Australian representatives in any contest of international nature; and control the recognition of all "best on record" performances.

Within a short time the Amateur Swimming Union of Australia had extended its charter to include negotiation with the recently formed International Swimming Federation (Fédération Internationale de Natation, FINA).

James Taylor was the foundation president and served for the first 35 years of the body's existence from 1909 to 1944.

During 1985, under a new corporate structure, the Amateur Swimming Union of Australia was incorporated in the Australian Capital Territory and became Australian Swimming Inc.

On 1 October 2004, Australian Swimming became a company limited by guarantee and changed its name to Swimming Australia Ltd. Glenn Tasker served as the chief executive officer until June 2008, and the organisation's headquarters is located at Unit 12, 7 Beissel Street, Belconnen, ACT. In 2013, Mark Anderson was appointed CEO.

The Australian Swim Team underwent a rebranding in 2014 and was renamed the Australian Dolphins Swimming Team.

In 2022, it established the Swimming Australia Hall of Fame.

Swimming Australia supports and runs the Swimming Australia National Training Centre at the Australian Institute of Sport in Canberra.

Australian Swimmers of the Year 
Swimming Australia announces a number of awards annually, most notably the Australian Swimmer of the Year Award.

Stakeholders and affiliations 
Swimming Australia's key stakeholders includes:
Swimming New South Wales
Swimming Victoria
Swimming Queensland
Swimming South Australia
Swimming Western Australia
Swimming Tasmania
Swimming Northern Territory
Swimming ACT
Australian Swimming Coaches and Teachers Association (ASCTA)
Australian Swimmers Association

Swimming Australia is affiliated to the following bodies:
The Fédération Internationale de Natation (FINA)
The Australian Olympic Committee (AOC)
The Australian Commonwealth Games Association (ACGA)
The Australian Paralympic Committee (APC)
Oceania Swimming Association
Australian Water Safety Council

Whilst the following organisations are affiliated with Swimming Australia:
Australian Waterpolo Association Inc
Australian Diving Association Inc
Australian Synchronised Swimming
AUSSI Masters Swimming in Australia

Swimming Australia is also a foundation member of AUSTSWIM and is involved in the development of an Australian Water Safety Organisation.

Sexual abuse allegations 
In July 2014 the Royal Commission into Institutional Responses to Child Sexual Abuse, a Royal Commission of inquiry initiated in 2013 by the Australian Government and supported by all of its state governments, began an investigation into the responses of the Offices of the Directors of Public Prosecutions in Queensland and New South Wales to determine whether to prosecute allegations of child sexual assault; the response of Scone Swimming Club to the convictions of Stephen John Roser for indecent assault and for committing acts of indecency against a child; and related matters. Six former students, a number of swimming executives, government officials, Margaret Cunneen , Anthony Moynihan , Nicholas Cowdery , Lloyd Babb , The Honourable Justice Leanne Clare  and Paul Rutledge gave evidence or made statements before the Royal Commission. The Royal Commission heard from women who alleged they had been abused as children and that despite informing officials, the alleged perpetrators did not face criminal trial on the basis of recommendations provided by government prosecutors in both New South Wales and Queensland. In April 2015 Swimming Australia president John Bertrand issued an apology to former swim students who were victims of sexual abuse.

Allegations against various swimming coaches were reported as first aired in the media up to ten years earlier; and new cases were alleged following the Royal Commission hearings.

See also 
Diving Australia
Swim Kids
Swimming ACT

References

External links 
 Official website
 
 Swimming Australia Team interviewed by students
 Australian Olympic swimmers admit using sedative

Australia
Sports governing bodies in Australia
Swimming organizations
Swimming in Australia
1909 establishments in Australia
Australian Water Safety Council members
Sports organizations established in 1909